Lillie Glacier is a large glacier in Antarctica, about  long and  wide. It lies between the Bowers Mountains on the west and the Concord Mountains and Anare Mountains on the east, flowing to Ob' Bay on the coast and forming the Lillie Glacier Tongue.

The glacier tongue, the prominent seaward extension of the glacier into Ob' Bay, was discovered by the British Antarctic Expedition, 1910–13, when the Terra Nova explored westward of Cape North in February 1911. It was named by the expedition for Dennis G. Lillie, a biologist on the Terra Nova. The name Lillie has since been extended to the entire glacier.

The lower half of the glacier was plotted by the Australian National Antarctic Research Expedition (Thala Dan) in 1962, which explored the area and utilized air photos taken by U.S. Navy Operation Highjump, 1946–47. The whole feature was mapped by the United States Geological Survey from surveys and U.S. Navy air photos, 1960–62.

See also
 List of glaciers in the Antarctic
 Lloyd Icefall

References

Glaciers of Pennell Coast